Jalmenus lithochroa, the lithochroa blue or Waterhouse's hairstreak, is a butterfly of the family Lycaenidae. It is endemic to a small area around Adelaide in South Australia.

The wingspan is about 30 mm.

The larvae feed on Acacia pycnantha and Acacia victoriae.

The caterpillars are attended by the ant species Iridomyrmex purpureus and  Iridomyrmex viridiaeneus.

External links
Australian Insects 
Australian Faunal Directory

Theclinae
Butterflies described in 1903
Butterflies of Australia